Lifelines (released 1981 in Germany) is the fourth album by Norwegian jazz bassist and composer Arild Andersen, recorded July 1980 at Talent Studio, Oslo, and released on the ECM label (ECM 1188). Andersen chose to depart from his usual quartet for Lifelines, forming a new one to take advantage of long held musical relationships with Kenny Wheeler and Paul Motian. Though the quartet toured Norway prior to the album sessions, its existence was short-lived. Andersen would nevertheless go on to perform with each of the quartet's members in different musical configurations and projects.

Track listing 
All compositions by Arild Andersen except as indicated
 "Cameron" (6:23)
 "Prelude" - composed by Steve Dobrogosz (5:53)
 "Landloper" (0:48)
 "Predawn" (6:02)
 "Dear Kenny" (6:20)
 "A Song I Used To Play" (2:42)
 "Lifelines" (6:28)
 "Anew" - composed by Radka Toneff (8:30)
Recorded at Talent Studios in Oslo, Norway in July 1980

Personnel 
Arild Andersen - double bass
Kenny Wheeler - flugelhorn & cornet
Steve Dobrogosz - piano 
Paul Motian - drums

Credits 
Design – Klaus Detjen
Engineer – Jan Erik Kongshaug
Cover Photo: » Damaged Bag Of Records « – Gabor Attalai
Producer – Manfred Eicher

References 

ECM Records albums
Arild Andersen albums
1981 albums
Albums produced by Manfred Eicher